The Lake Waikaremoana Great Walk is a  tramping track which follows the southern and western coast of Lake Waikaremoana in the North Island of New Zealand. Passing through several types of forest, and grassland, the track often provides views over the lake. It is classified as one of New Zealand's Great Walks, and is located in the former Te Urewera National Park.

As of November 2021, the walk is closed and has been for several months.

It has now been fully reopened to the public.

Tramping 
The trailheads are at Onepoto, and Hopuruahine, on the southern and northern edges of the lake respectively. Most people take 3 to 4 days to complete the trail.

The trail passes through several areas of private land, and touches the edge of the Puketukutuku Peninsula Kiwi Refuge.

The Department of Conservation provides very conservative estimates on the hiking time from point to point on the track, and experienced hikers may cover quoted distances in half of the recommended time.

Transport 
As this track is not a circuit, transport is needed between the start and end of the trail. Most trampers use the services of one of the local shuttle bus or shuttle boat operators who can deliver and pick up trampers at pre-arranged times. The start and end of the trail are both on State Highway 38.

There is a motor camp at Home Bay (Whanganui o parua Inlet), near the Āniwaniwa Visitor Centre. All the huts/campsites are also accessible by boat, except for Panekire Hut, and there are several boat-ramps along State Highway 38.

Location 

The Lake Waikaremoana Great Walk is located within the now-disestablished Te Urewera National Park. The nearest town to the trail is Wairoa, from where there are shuttles on demand to the lake.

Waikaremoana can be approached from two directions. State Highway 38 links Wairoa and the East Coast with the central North Island and passes the lake and the Āniwaniwa Visitor Centre. The highway is unsealed for about 80 kilometres between Murupara and the village of Tuai. There are well-marked side roads to the main boat ramps and Lake Track entrances.

Further reading 

 Stuff article of November 2021 - Lake Waikaremoana and its Great Walk have been closed for months as Tūhoe say the relationship with the Crown has failed

References

External links 

 
 
 

Wairoa District
Hiking and tramping tracks in New Zealand
Tourist attractions in the Hawke's Bay Region
Geography of the Hawke's Bay Region